The tumbi or toombi (pronunciation: tūmbī), also called a tumba or toomba, is a traditional musical instrument from the Punjab region of the northern Indian subcontinent. The high-pitched, single-string plucking instrument is associated with folk music of Punjab and presently very popular in Western Bhangra music.

The tumbi was popularized in the modern era by the Punjabi folksinger Lal Chand Yamla Jatt (1914-1991). In the 1960s, 1970s, and 1980s many Punjabi singers adopted the tumbi, notably Kuldeep Manak, Mohammed Sadiq, Didar Sandhu, Amar Singh Chamkila, and Kartar Ramla. Other users include Punjabi Sufi singers such as Kanwar Grewal and Saeen Zahoor.

The instrument is made of a wooden stick mounted with a gourd shell resonator. A single metallic string passes across the resonator over a bridge and is tied to a tuning key at the end of the stick. Players strike the string with a continuous flick and retraction of the first finger to produce sound.

Use in Western music
Get Ur Freak On, 2001 hit single by Missy Elliott produced by Timbaland, saw the introduction of the distinct tumbi sound into the popular mainstream music scene.
Mundian Ton Bach Ke Rahin (Beware of Boys) from Panjabi MC, a huge hit in the UK charts, is perhaps the most widely known example of the use of tumbi in popular Western music.
20 Inch by Master P (featuring Jamaican reggae artist Cutty Ranks and rap artist Kobra Khan) included tumbi played by Toronto, Ontario, Canadian native Shawn Ramta (grandson of the famous Punjabi folk singer, Hazara Singh Ramta).
Baby Doll me Sone di features tumbi throughout the song.

Players

 Lal Chand Yamla Jatt
 Mohammed Sadiq
 Kuldeep Manak
 Didar Sandhu
 Amar Singh Chamkila
 Manmohan Waris
 Sarbjit Cheema
 Sukshinder Shinda
 Sukhwinder Panchhi
 Saeen Zahoor
 Sangtar

See also
 Ektara India
 Ek Tare Nepal
 Kendara
 Khamak

References

Further reading
Thuhi, Hardial. The Tumba-Algoza Ballad Tradition. Translated by Gibb Schreffler. Journal of Punjab Studies 18(1&2) (Spring-Fall 2011). pp. 169–202.

Punjabi music
Folk instruments of Punjab
Indian musical instruments
Monochords
Punjabi words and phrases
Pakistani musical instruments